C.C. and Company is a 1970 American biker film directed by Seymour Robbie. It starred Joe Namath as biker C.C. Ryder, Ann-Margret as fashion journalist Ann, and William Smith as Moon, the leader of the fictitious outlaw biker club the "Heads Company". The film also features singer Wayne Cochran and his band The C.C. Riders.

Plot 
C.C. Ryder falls in with a biker gang in the desert, and then rescues Ann from trouble with the same gang. There next occurs a motocross race tied in with a fashion shoot. The Heads disrupt the event, but C.C. Ryder enters the race to gain Ann's favor. This puts him in conflict with Moon. When Ryder wins the race and leaves with his award money the gang kidnaps Ann, and Ryder must ride back to save her.

Cast

 Joe Namath as C. C. Ryder
 Ann-Margret as Ann McCalley
 William Smith as Moon
 Jennifer Billingsley as Pom Pom
 Mike Battle as Rabbit
 Greg Mullavey as Lizard
 Teda Bracci as Pig
 Don Chastain as Eddie Ellis
 Sid Haig as Crow
 Bruce Glover as Captain Midnight
 Keva Kelly as Tandalaya
 Jackie Rohr as Zit-Zit
 Robert Keyworth as Charlie Hopkins
 Alan Pappe as Photographer
 Ned Wertimer as Motorcycle salesman
 Wayne Cochran as himself and his band

Reception 
Reviews were mostly negative. It was described by The New York Times reviewer Vincent Canby as "the picture to name when someone asks you to recommend 'a good bad movie.'": 

In his Chicago Tribune review, Gene Siskel, who supplied it with no stars, felt it was "hateful", adding: 

The film was also blasted by the Cleveland Press' Tony Mastroianni:

Filmink called it a "remarkably poor vehicle for Ann-Margret "considering it was written by her husband."

See also
 List of American films of 1970

References

External links
 
 
 
 
 

1970 films
1970s English-language films
1970s action comedy-drama films
Motorcycling films
American action comedy-drama films
Films produced by Allan Carr
Embassy Pictures films
Outlaw biker films
1970 comedy films
1970 drama films
1970 directorial debut films
1970s American films